NBA Live 16 is a basketball simulation video game developed by EA Tiburon and published by EA Sports released for the PlayStation 4, Xbox One, PlayStation 3, and Xbox 360 on September 29, 2015, in North America, simultaneously with  2K Sports' NBA 2K16, and on October 1, 2015, worldwide. The 20th installment of NBA Live, its cover athlete is Russell Westbrook of the Oklahoma City Thunder. EA did not release a new installment in the series the following year, instead resuming in 2017 with NBA Live 18. A mobile version of NBA Live 16 released in-between, beating NBA 2K to the mobile market.

Development
Improved defense play, offense play, passing play, shooting play, dribbling play, and more animations are included in NBA Live 16 as well as Freestyle Control and Movement with improved visuals. This game mode allows players to play basketball life on and off the court with more clothes and a new Game Face app for iOS and Android devices.

Live Run, a 5v5 online multiplayer mode, returned for the first time since NBA Live 10, while introducing a new cooperative mode, Summer Circuit. Both modes are set in outdoor and indoor venues across various real-life cities, such as Venice Beach, Brooklyn, and Seattle. EA Sports describes their new league vs. league tournaments stating, "Work as a team and score as many points as possible to earn a win. Each member in the tournament will get to play 3 quarters. Select an opponent to play and score as many points as possible while playing good defense." The Rising Star game mode allows players to create a character and work their way up to stardom in the NBA, leveling-up by using Experience Points earned after playing NBA games and in Pro-Am games.

Reception

NBA Live 16 received generally mixed reviews on Metacritic. Critics highlighted improvements in game modes and overall quality of picture, but common complaints were associated with lag. Dissatisfied with gameplay, IGN rated the game 6.0 out of 10, stating, "flashy presentation and interesting new game modes can only go as far as the stiff and laggy gameplay will take it." IGN also noted clumsy controls that can only go so far within this game. Bleacher Report rated it 7.4, giving mostly positive statements, saying,  "at its best, NBA Live 16 flows incredibly well with smooth back-and-forth action at venues spanning the globe and most times details look great in the process". EGMNOW rated the game 6.5 citing mixed feelings, stating, "NBA Live 16 takes a small baby step forward with the franchise, but there are still core gameplay elements that need to be smoothed out before it can be a championship caliber game".

See also
NBA 2K16

References

External links
 

2015 video games
Electronic Arts games
NBA Live
PlayStation 4 games
Video games set in 2015
Video games set in 2016
Xbox One games
Video games developed in the United States